Jean-Michel Clément (born 31 October 1954) is a French politician who has been serving as a member of the National Assembly of France since the 2007 elections, representing the 3rd constituency of the Vienne department. He is a former member of La République En Marche! (LREM) and of the Socialist Party.

Political career
In parliament, Clément serves on the Committee on Foreign Affairs. In addition to his committee assignments, he is a member of the French-Greek Parliamentary Friendship Group and the French-Irish Parliamentary Friendship Group. Since 2019, he has also been a member of the French delegation to the Franco-German Parliamentary Assembly.

Following disagreements over a parliamentary vote on immigration in April 2018, Clément became the first lawmaker to leave then two-year-old LREM. In October 2018, he was one of the founding members of the Liberties and Territories parliamentary group.

He was a Miscellaneous left candidate in the 2022 French legislative election, he was beaten in the first round, collecting 11.98% and arriving in fourth position. He is preceded by candidates from the National Rally, the presidential majority and the New People's Ecological and Social Union.

References

1954 births
Living people
University of Poitiers alumni
People from Vienne
Socialist Party (France) politicians
Deputies of the 13th National Assembly of the French Fifth Republic
Deputies of the 14th National Assembly of the French Fifth Republic
Deputies of the 15th National Assembly of the French Fifth Republic
La République En Marche! politicians
Politicians from Nouvelle-Aquitaine